Of Birds, Bees, Butterflies, Etc. is the second studio album by American house music group Late Night Alumni. It was released through Ultra Records as a digital download on November 3, 2009 with the physical CD being released later on February 2, 2010.

On September 1, 2009, the group released "You Can Be the One" as their first single from the album. The singles contains remixes by Sultan & Ned Shepard, Killgore & John Hollow, while the Sultan & Ned Shepard remix became its own single later on September 22, 2009. A music video for the live version of the song was uploaded to Late Night Alumni's YouTube channel on October 12, 2009, and it has often been compare to Kaskade's music video for his song, "4AM", with Becky Jean Williams. Another single for the song "Finally Found" was released on December 22, 2009, as well as a music video on March 16, 2010.

Track listing

References

External links
 Of Birds, Bees, Butterflies, Etc. on Discogs

2009 albums
Late Night Alumni albums
Ultra Records albums